Prehistoric Park is a six-part nature docu-fiction television mini-series that premiered on ITV on 22 July 2006 and on Animal Planet on 29 October 2006. The programme was produced by Impossible Pictures, who also created Walking with Dinosaurs. Each episode is an hour long including commercial breaks. Repeats of the show are broadcast in the UK on Watch.

The programme is narrated by David Jason and presented by Nigel Marven. The fictional component is the theme that Nigel goes back to various geological time periods through a space-time portal, and brings live specimens of extinct animals back to the present day, where they are exhibited in a wildlife park named Prehistoric Park, which is a big area between high steep mountains and ocean, with varied environments, in what looks like KwaZulu-Natal province in South Africa.

Story
The story, which is told in the style of a documentary, focuses on naturalist Nigel Marven leading missions to find and collect extinct animals from the distant past by use of a time machine. The animals are then placed in the confines of Prehistoric Park, a private wildlife park that is situated in a dry, mountainous region of an unspecified part of the world. Marven's core motivation in the series is to defy extinction and to give select extinct species a second chance at life.

Characters
 Nigel Marven as himself, the main presenter of the show.
 Rod Arthur as Bob, the long-suffering head keeper at the park. In charge of feeding, cleaning and controlling the animals in the park.
 Suzanne McNabb as herself, the head veterinarian. Responsible for treating animals when they are sick or injured.
 Morgan Williams as Ben, one of Nigel's crew. Four Mei long attacked him for meat in his backpack. Introduced in episode 3.
 Saba Douglas-Hamilton as herself, a big cat specialist, whom Nigel invites back to catch Smilodon in episode 4.

Locations within the park
When the animals are brought back to the park, they are placed into a nearby enclosure. The enclosures are named after the extinct animals that they are housing.
 Mammoth Mount: This enclosure houses the park's woolly mammoth Martha.
 T-Rex Hill: T-Rex Hill is home to the park's pair of Tyrannosaurus rex, Terence and Matilda.
 Big Cat Climb: This two part enclosure features a pair of breeding Smilodons.
 Triceratops Creek: Theo is the resident Triceratops at Triceratops Creek.
 Deinosuchus Dip: This is a huge lake, where the park's Deinosuchus is kept.
 Ornithomimus Pond: This paddock features a flock of Ornithomimus.
 The Bug House: This state-of-the-art enclosure keeps its Carboniferous period creatures safe. Its oxygen levels inside are double what they are today, maintaining a sustainable environment for the park's Arthropleura, Meganeura and Pulmonoscorpius specimens.

Episodes

Filming locations

Home release

 The Region 1 DVD was released on 5 June 2007 by BCI Eclipse, under license from Fremantle Media.
 The Region 2 DVD was released in Britain on 28 August 2006 by Fremantle Media.
 The Region 4 DVD was released in Australia and surrounding islands on 6 October 2006. Charles Wooley narrated the series when broadcast on Australia's Nine Network, and the Region 4 DVD has the original narration by David Jason.
 The Region 3 DVD was released in Indonesia by Medialine Entertainment.

Awards and nominations

References

External links
 Prehistoric Park at itv.com/citv (including episode guide and images)
 Animal Planet - Prehistoric Park
 Impossible Pictures minisite
 Nigel Marven's production photos
 

2006 British television series debuts
2006 British television series endings
Animal Planet original programming
ITV documentaries
Documentary television series about dinosaurs
British time travel television series
English-language television shows
2000s British documentary television series